Events in the year 1991 in Brazil.

Incumbents

Federal government
 President: Fernando Collor de Mello
 Vice President: Itamar Franco

Governors 
 Acre: Édison Simão Cadaxo (until 15 March); Edmundo Pinto (from 15 March)
 Alagoas: Moacir Andrade (until 15 March); Geraldo Bulhões (from 15 March)
 Amapa: Annibal Barcellos (from 1 January)
 Amazonas: Vivaldo Barroso Frota (until 15 March); Gilberto Mestrinho (from 15 March)
 Bahia: Nilo Moraes Coelho then Antônio Carlos Magalhães
 Ceará: Tasso Jereissati (until 15 March); Ciro Gomes (from 15 March)
 Espírito Santo: Max Freitas Mauro (until 15 March); Albuíno Cunha de Azeredo (from 15 March)
 Federal District: Wanderley Vallim
 Goiás: Henrique Santillo (until 15 March); Iris Rezende (from 15 March)
 Maranhão: João Alberto de Souza (until 15 March); Edison Lobão (from 15 March)
 Mato Grosso: Edison de Oliveira then Jaime Campos
 Mato Grosso do Sul: Marcelo Miranda Soares (until 1 March); Pedro Pedrossian (from 1 March)
 Minas Gerais: Newton Cardoso (until 15 March); Hélio Garcia (from 15 March)
 Pará: Hélio Gueiros (until 15 March); Jader Barbalho (from 15 March)
 Paraíba: Tarcísio Burity (until 15 March); Ronaldo Cunha Lima (from 15 March)
 Paraná: Alvaro Dias then Roberto Requião de Mello e Silva 
 Pernambuco: Joaquim Francisco Cavalcanti (until 15 March); Joaquim Francisco Cavalcanti (from 15 March)
 Piauí: Alberto Silva (until 15 March); Freitas Neto (from 15 March)
 Rio de Janeiro: Moreira Franco then Leonel Brizola 
 Rio Grande do Norte: Geraldo José Ferreira de Melo (until 15 March); José Agripino Maia (from 15 March)
 Rio Grande do Sul: Sinval Sebastião Duarte Guazzelli (until 15 March); Alceu de Deus Collares (from 15 March)
 Rondônia: Jerônimo Garcia de Santana (until 15 March); Oswaldo Piana Filho (from 15 March)
 Roraima: Rubens Vilar (until 15 March); Ottomar de Sousa Pinto (from 15 March)
 Santa Catarina: Casildo Maldaner (until 15 March); Vilson Kleinübing (from 15 March)
 São Paulo: Orestes Quércia (until 15 March); Luís Antônio Fleury Filho (from 15 March)
 Sergipe: Antônio Carlos Valadares (until 15 March); João Alves Filho (from 15 March)
 Tocantins: José Wilson Siqueira Campos (until 15 March); Moisés Nogueira Avelino (from 15 March)

Vice governors
 Acre: Romildo Magalhães da Silva (from 15 March)
 Alagoas: Francisco Roberto Holanda de Melo (from 15 March)
 Amapá: Ronaldo Pinheiro Borges (from 1 January)
 Amazonas: Francisco Garcia Rodrigues (from 15 March)
 Bahia: Paulo Souto (from 15 March)
 Ceará: Francisco Castelo de Castro (until 15 March); Lúcio Gonçalo de Alcântara (from 15 March)
 Espírito Santo: Carlos Alberto Batista da Cunha (until 15 March); Adelson Antônio Salvador (from 15 March) 
 Goiás: Joaquim Domingos Roriz (until 15 March); Luís Alberto Maguito Vilela (from 15 March)
 Maranhão: José de Ribamar Fiquene (from 15 March) 
 Mato Grosso: Osvaldo Roberto Sobrinho (from 15 March)
 Mato Grosso do Sul: George Takimoto (until 14 March); Ary Rigo (from 15 March)
 Minas Gerais: Júnia Marise de Azeredo Coutinho (until 31 January); Arlindo Porto Neto (from 15 March)
 Pará: Hermínio Calvinho Filho (until 15 March); Carlos José Oliveira Santos (from 15 March)
 Paraíba: Cícero Lucena Filho (from 15 March)
 Paraná: Ary Veloso Queiroz (until 15 March); Mario Pereira (from 15 March)
 Pernambuco: Carlos Roberto Guerra Fontes (from 15 March)
 Piauí: Lucídio Portela Nunes (until 31 January); Guilherme Cavalcante de Melo (from 15 March)
 Rio de Janeiro: Francisco de Assis Amaral (until 15 March); Nilo Batista (from 15 March)
 Rio Grande do Norte: Garibaldi Alves (until 15 March); Vivaldo Costa (from 15 March)
 Rio Grande do Sul: João Gilberto Lucas Coelho (from 15 March)
 Rondônia: Orestes Muniz Filho (until 15 March); Assis Canuto (from 15 March)
 Roraima: Antônio Airton Oliveira Dias (from 1 January)
 Santa Catarina: Antônio Carlos Konder Reis (from 15 March)
 São Paulo: vacant (until 15 March); Aloysio Nunes (from 15 March)
 Sergipe: Benedito de Figueiredo (until 15 March); José Carlos Mesquita Teixeira (from 15 March)
 Tocantins: Darci Martins Coelho (until 15 March); Paulo Sidnei Antunes (from 15 March)

Events 
1 January - Amapá, a former territory, becomes Brazil's 26th state. It was the most recent state to be established in the country.

Births 
4 April – Lucas Lucco, singer, songwriter and actor
9 April – Sancler Frantz, model and journalist
21 June – Bruno Aquino, footballer
26 June – Jesuíta Barbosa, actor
28 August – Humberto Carrão, actor
3 September – Maurício Destri, actor
16 September – Marlon Teixeira, model
2 October – Roberto Firmino, footballer
6 November – Camila Finn, model

Deaths 
17 January – Antônio Villas Boas, farmer who claimed alien abduction (born 1934)
31 July – João Chedid, Maronite bishop (born 1914)
4 December – Moysés Baumstein, holographer and artist (born 1931)

See also 
1991 in Brazilian football
1991 in Brazilian television

References

 
1990s in Brazil
Years of the 20th century in Brazil
Brazil
Brazil